John Zenevisi or Gjon Zenebishi ( or Gjin Zenebishi; died 1418) was an Albanian magnate that held the estates in Epirus, such as Argyrokastro (Gjirokastër) and Vagenetia.

Name
Zenevisi can be found with different spellings in historical documents. His name in modern English is usually John Zenevisi or John Sarbissa. In Italian, his name was spelled as Giovanni Sarbissa. In Albanian, his name is mostly spelled as Gjin Zenebishi (less commonly as Zenebishti), his given name scarcely spelled Gjon, as well. In Serbian his name is spelled like Jovan Zenović.

Life

The Zenevisi family was from the Zagoria region, between Përmet and Argyrokastro (Gjirokastër).

In 1381 and 1384, the Catholic lords of Arta asked the Ottoman troops for protection against the invading Albanian clan of the Zenevisi; the Ottomans routed the raiders and restored order in Epirus. Zenevisi submitted to the Ottomans after their victory against Balša II in the Battle of Savra in 1385, and gave them his son as a hostage to be sent to Edirne to the court of the sultan (this son became known as Hamza, an Ottoman official). Shortly after his submission, Zenevisi revolted and seized the fortress of Gjirokastër, encouraged no doubt by the attack on Ioannina by the Albanians of Acarnania. In 1386 he titled himself with the Byzantine title of sevastokrator.

Zenevisi was married Irene, the daughter of Gjin Bua Shpata, Despot of Arta, and thus became the son-in-law of Shpata and the brother-in-law of the wife of Esau de' Buondelmonti Despot of Epiros. In 1399 Esau, supported by some Albanian clans, marched against his wife's brother-in-law John Zenevisi of Gjirokastër. Now Esau was routed and captured, and much of his land was occupied by Zenevisi. The neighboring magnates determined to restore the captured despotes and secured Venetian intercession in his favor. Esau returned to Ioannina in 1400, regaining the reign from Zenevisi. In 1402, Esau divorced Irene Shpata and married Jevdokija Balšić, the brother of Konstantin Balšić, a leading Ottoman official in northern Albania. After Esau's death (February 6, 1411), his wife Jevdokija tried to take control of Ioannina, but the town exiled her and appointed Esau's nephew, Carlo Tocco, as lord (he arrived on April 1, 1411).

In 1412 Maurice Shpata and Zenevisi (who was the leader of the most powerful tribe in the vicinity of Ioannina) formed an alliance against Carlo Tocco. They won an open-field battle against Tocco in 1412, but were unable to take over Ioannina. Tocco relied on support from the local Greeks. In 1414, Maurice Spata died, and Zenevisi was defeated by the Ottomans and fled to the Venetian island of Corfu where he died in 1418.

Aftermath
In the same year the Ottomans, after a prolonged siege, took Gjirokastër. Zenevisi's son, Thopia Zenevisi, fled to Corfu. He landed again on the mainland and laid siege to Gjirokastër in 1434, but was killed in battle with a reinforcing Ottoman army in 1435.

Titles
Lord (signore) of Makasi (1382)
sevastokrator of Vagenetia and lord of Argyrokastron and Paracalo (after 1386).

Descendants
Zenevisi's descendants continued to live undisturbed in the mountains of Zagoria and eventually faded into history. In 1455, a certain Simon Zenevisi, who was the lord of Kastrovillari (Castro i Vivarit near Butrint) was active at the court of the king of Naples and Aragon on behalf of Skanderbeg in order to gain back Napolitan support for his land in Albania. In 1455, Venice, the only power to support his claim, reminded him of his pledge of allegiance to them but was not able to change his political orientation, i.e. his ties with Naples. A son of this Zenevisi was also a hostage at the court of the sultan, this time of Sultan Mehmed the Conqueror, but fled to Naples where King Alphonso had him baptized and made him his vassal. The fate of this Alfonso Zenevisi was to be closely linked to that of Skanderbeg.

Zenebishi Family
John married a daughter of Gjin Bua Shpata, whose name is unknown. They had the following children:

 A1. Anna ("Kyrianna"), Lady of Grabossa; married Andrea III Musachi (fl. 1419)
 A2. Maria, +after 1419; married Perotto d'Altavilla, the Baron of Corfu (+1445)
 A3. Thopia Zenevisi ("Depas", d. 1435), Lord of Argyrokastron (1418–34), deposed by the Ottomans
 B1. Simone Zenevisi, Lord of the Strovilo (1443–61), deposed by the Ottomans
 C1. Alfonso (fl. 1456), an Ottoman political hostage who fled to Naples and became a Napolitan vassal
 C2. Alessandro ("Lech"), Lord of Strovilo which he then sold to Venice in 1473
 C3. Filippo, served Alessandro
 A4. Hamza Zenevisi ("Amos", fl. 1456–60), an Ottoman political hostage, he was converted into Islam and entered Ottoman service. In 1460 he became a sanjakbey of the Sanjak of Mezistre.
 A5. Hasan Zenevisi, subaşi in Tetovo in 1455

Legacy 
The Kardhiq Castle was built by Gjon Zenebishi

See also
 Albanian principalities
 History of Albania

References

John
John
1418 deaths
14th-century Albanian people
15th-century Albanian people
Year of birth unknown